The following Confederate States Army units and commanders fought in the Bristoe campaign (October 13–November 7, 1863) of the American Civil War. The Union order of battle is listed separately. Order of battle compiled from the army organization from September 30, 1863, the casualty returns and the reports.

Abbreviations used

Military rank
 Gen = General
 LTG = Lieutenant General
 MG = Major General
 BG = Brigadier General
 Col = Colonel
 Ltc = Lieutenant Colonel
 Maj = Major
 Cpt = Captain

Other
 (w) = wounded
 (mw) = mortally wounded
 (k) = killed in action
 (c) = captured

Army of Northern Virginia

Gen Robert E. Lee

Second Corps

LTG Richard S. Ewell

Third Corps

LTG Ambrose P. Hill

 Provost Guard: 5th Alabama Battalion

Cavalry Corps

MG J. E. B. Stuart

Reserve Artillery
BG William N. Pendleton

Notes

References
 Eicher, John H., and David J. Eicher. Civil War High Commands. Stanford, CA: Stanford University Press, 2001. .
 Sibley, F. Ray Jr., The Confederate Order of Battle, Volume 1, The Army of Northern Virginia, Shippensburg, Pennsylvania, 1996. 
 U.S. War Department, The War of the Rebellion: a Compilation of the Official Records of the Union and Confederate Armies], U.S. Government Printing Office, 1880–1901.

American Civil War orders of battle